In economics and consumer theory, quasilinear utility functions are linear in one argument, generally the numeraire. Quasilinear preferences can be represented by the utility function  where  is strictly concave. A useful property of the quasilinear utility function is that the Marshallian/Walrasian demand for  does not depend on wealth and is thus not subject to a wealth effect;  The absence of a wealth effect simplifies analysis and makes quasilinear utility functions a common choice for modelling.  Furthermore, when utility is quasilinear, compensating variation (CV), equivalent variation (EV), and consumer surplus are algebraically equivalent.  In mechanism design, quasilinear utility ensures that agents can compensate each other with side payments.

Definition in terms of preferences
A preference relation  is quasilinear with respect to commodity 1 (called, in this case, the numeraire commodity) if:
 All the indifference sets are parallel displacements of each other along the axis of commodity 1. That is, if a bundle "x" is indifferent to a bundle "y" (x~y), then 
 Good 1 is desirable; that is, 

In other words: a preference relation is quasilinear if there is one commodity, called the numeraire, which shifts the indifference curves outward as consumption of it increases, without changing their slope.

In two dimensional case, the indifference curves are parallel; which is useful because the entire utility function can be determined from a single indifference curve.

Definition in terms of utility functions
A utility function is quasilinear in commodity 1 if it is in the form

where  is an arbitrary function. In the case of two goods this function could be, for example, 

The quasilinear form is special in that the demand functions for all but one of the consumption goods depend only on the prices and not on the income. E.g, with two commodities with prices px = 1 and py , if

then, maximizing utility subject to the constraint that the demands for the two goods sum to a given income level, the demand for y is derived from the equation

so

which is independent of the income I. 

The indirect utility function in this case is

which is a special case of the Gorman polar form.

Equivalence of definitions 
The cardinal and ordinal definitions are equivalent in the case of a convex consumption set with continuous preferences that are locally non-satiated in the first argument.

See also
Quasiconvex function
Linear utility function - a special type of a quasilinear utility function.

References

Financial economics
Utility function types